Maciej Tomasz Grubski (20 August 1968 – 17 December 2020) was a Polish politician from the Civic Platform.

Biography
He served as member of the Senate of Poland from 2007 to 2019.

Grubski died of COVID-19 during the COVID-19 pandemic in Poland, at age 52.

References

1968 births
2020 deaths
Politicians from Łódź
Democratic Union (Poland) politicians
Freedom Union (Poland) politicians
Civic Platform politicians
Members of the Senate of Poland 2011–2015
Deaths from the COVID-19 pandemic in Poland
Members of the Senate of Poland 2015–2019